James Edward Hoare (born 1943) is a British academic and historian specialising in Korean and Chinese studies, and a career diplomat in the British Foreign Office.

Academia
Dr. Hoare is a graduate of London's School of Oriental and African Studies (SOAS).  He has long been a member of the Anglo-Korean Society, the Korean Branch of the Royal Asiatic Society, and the Royal Society for Asian Affairs.

In 2006, Dr. Hoare was President of the British Association of Korean Studies (BAKS).

Foreign service
After Britain and North Korea re-established diplomatic relations in 2000, Hoare was appointed British Chargé d'affaires in Pyongyang; and his work laid the foundation for the establishment of a full embassy in the North Korean capital.

Previously, Hoare had been head of the Foreign Office's North Asia and Pacific Research Group.  He joined the Foreign and Commonwealth Office in 1969 and was stationed in Seoul in 1981-1984 and in Beijing in 1988-1991.

Selected work
In a statistical overview derived from writings by and about James Hoare, OCLC/WorldCat encompasses roughly 30+ works in 60+ publications in 3 languages and 4,000+ library holdings.

Books
 2018 - Culture, Power and Politics in Treaty-Port Japan 1854-1899  (cloth)
2015 - Historical Dictionary of the Republic of Korea 
 2013 -  Critical Readings on North and South Korea  (cloth)
2012 - Historical Dictionary of Democratic People's Republic of Korea 
 2005 - A Political and Economic Dictionary of East Asia 
 2007 - Korea: The Past and Present with Susan Pares. London: Global Oriental.  (cloth)
 1999 - Britain and Japan: Biographical Portraits, Vol. III. London: RoutledgeCurzon.  (cloth)
 1999 -  Embassies in the East: The Story of the British and their Embassies in China, Japan and Korea from 1859 to the Present. London: Curzon. 
 1999 --  Korea: a Historical and Cultural Dictionary with Richard Rutt. London: Routledge. 
 1994 - Japan's Treaty Ports and Foreign Settlements: The Uninvited Guests 1858-1899. London: Curzon. 
 1994 - Nish, Ian and James E. Hoare, eds.  Britain & Japan: Biographical Portraits, Vol. II. London: RoutledgeCurzon. 
1988 - James Hoare & Susan Pares. Korea: An Introduction. Keegan Paul International. https://books.google.com/books/about/Korea.html?id=_zoOAAAAQAAJ.

Periodicals
 1994 - "Building Politics: the British Embassy Peking, 1949-1992," in ''The Pacific Review,' Vol. 7.

See also
 List of Ambassadors from the United Kingdom to North Korea
 Global Oriental

Notes

British diplomats
British diplomats in East Asia
Living people
1943 births
Koreanists
British sinologists
British orientalists